Elisabeth Ekblom (born 10 February 1958) is a former professional tennis player from Sweden.

Biography
Ekblom was a semifinalist at the 1976 Australian Open as a 17-year-old. She started her run with a straight sets win over second seed Kerry Reid, then defeated unseeded players Kathleen Harter and Christine Matison. In the semifinal, she was beaten by Czechoslovakia's Renáta Tomanová.

In 1978, she made her Fed Cup debut for Sweden in a first round tie against France. She played other Fed Cup ties in 1981 against Denmark and Czechoslovakia.

Her only title on the WTA Tour came in the doubles at Hamburg in 1982 with Lena Sandin.

WTA Tour finals

Doubles (1-0)

References

External links
 
 
 

1958 births
Living people
Swedish female tennis players
20th-century Swedish women
21st-century Swedish women